The Sarajevo Beltway is a beltway in Bosnia and Herzegovina. It runs from the southern part of Sarajevo, the capital city of Bosnia and Herzegovina, towards local exits near Blažuj.
The Sarajevo Beltway is part of European route E73. The beltway has 4 exits including 2 interchanges.

Exit list 

Ring roads
Highways in Bosnia and Herzegovina
Transport in Sarajevo